Caltabiano is an Italian surname. Notable people with the surname include:

 Michael Caltabiano (born 1964), Australian politician
 Ronald Caltabiano (born 1959), American composer
 Tom Caltabiano, American comedian
 Mitch Caltabiano, (born 2002), Internet personality 

Italian-language surnames